Snellenia miltocrossa is a species of moth of the Stathmopodidae family. It was described by Turner in 1923. It is found in New South Wales.

References

Moths described in 1923
Stathmopodidae